The Lạc Việt or Luoyue ( or ; pinyin: Luòyuè ← Middle Chinese: *lɑk̚-ɦʉɐt̚ ← Old Chinese *râk-wat) were a conglomeration of multilinguistic, specifically Kra-Dai and Austroasiatic, Yue tribal peoples that inhabited ancient northern Vietnam, and, particularly the ancient Red River Delta, from ca. 700 BC to 100 AD, during the last stage of Neolithic Southeast Asia and the beginning of classical antiquity period. From the archaeological perspectives, they were known as the Dongsonian. The Lac Viet was known for casting large Heger Type I bronze drums, cultivating paddy rice, and constructing dikes. The Lạc Việt who owned the Bronze Age Đông Sơn culture, which centered at the Red River Delta (now in northern Vietnam, in mainland Southeast Asia), are hypothesized to be the ancestors of the modern Kinh Vietnamese. Another population of Luoyue, who inhabited the Zuo river's valley (now in modern Southern China), are believed to be the ancestors of the modern Zhuang people; additionally, Luoyue in southern China are believed to be ancestors of Hlai people.

Etymology
The ethnonym Lạc'''s etymology is uncertain.

Based on Chinese observers' remarks that the Lạc people's paddies depended on water-control systems like tidal-irrigation & draining, so that the floody, swampy Red River delta might be suitable for agriculture, many scholars opted to find its etymology in the semantic field "water". Japanese scholar Gotō Kimpei links Lạc to Vietnamese noun(s) lạch ~ rạch "ditch, canal, waterway". Vietnamese scholar Nguyễn Kim Thản (apud Vũ Thế Ngọc, 1989) suggests that Lạc simply means "water" and is comparable to phonetically similar elements in two compounds nước rạc (lit. "ebbing (tidal) water") & cạn rặc (lit. "utterly dried up [of water]").

On the other hand, French linguist Michel Ferlus proposes that 駱/雒 (OC *rak) is monosyllabified from the areal ethnonym *b.rak ~ *p.rak by loss of the first element in the iambic cluster. The ethnonym *b.rak ~ *p.rak underlies *prɔːk, ethnonym of the Wa people, *rɔːk, ethonym of a Khmu subgroup, and possibly the ethnonym of Bai people (白族 Báizú). Ferlus also suggests that *b.rak ~ *p.rak underlies 百越 Bǎiyuè (< OC*prâk-wat)'s first syllable 百 Bǎi (< OC *prâk), initially just a phonogram to transcribe the ethnonym *p.rak ~ *b.rak yet later reconstrued as "hundred". Ferlus etymologises 百 bǎi < *p.rak and 白 bái < *b.rak, used to name populations south of China, as from etymon *p.ra:k "taro > edible tuber", which underlays Kra-Dai cognate words meaning "taro" (e.g. Thai เผือก pʰɨakD1, Lakkia ja:k, Paha pɣaːk, etc.); and Ferlus additionally proposes that *p.ra:k was used to by rice-growers to designate taro-growing horticulturists.

History

According to legend, the Lạc Việt founded a state called Văn Lang in 2879 BC. They formed a loose circle of power led by Lac lords and princes, the territory is subdivided into fiefs governed by hereditary chiefs. Their leaders were called Lạc kings (Hùng kings) who were served by Lạc marquises and Lạc generals. According to the Records of the Grand Historian by Sima Qian, Âu Lạc was referred as the "Western Ou" (v. Tây Âu) and "Luo" (v. Lạc) and they were lumped into the category of Baiyue by the Sinitic peoples to the north.

The Warring States period's encyclopedia Lüshi Chunqiu mentioned the name Yueluo 越駱 (SV: Việt Lạc), which Han period's scholar Gao You asserted to be a country's name (國名).Lüshi Chunqiu, commentated by Gao You. Sibu Congkan version. original text: "越駱國名" page 14 However, neither Lüshi Chunqiu nor Gao You indicated where Yueluo was located. Sinologists Knoblock and Riegel propose that Yueluo 越駱 was probably a mistake for Luoyue 駱越.

According to a fourth century chronicle, Thục Phán (King An Dương) led the Hsi Ou tribe or the Âu Việt subdued the Lac and formed the kingdom of Âu Lạc in around 257 BC. The new Âu overlords established their headquarters in Tây Vu, where they built a large citadel, known to history as Cổ Loa or Cổ Loa Thành, "Ancient Conch Citadel." When Zhao Tuo, founder of Nanyue, conquered Âu Lạc and established Chinese rule over the delta in 180 BC, these Lac princes became his vassals. In 111 BC, the Western Han dynasty conquered Nanyue and incorporated the Lac Viet land into their empire, established the Jiaozhi, Jiuzhen and later Rinan commanderies in modern-day Vietnam. 

Reacting against a Chinese attempt to colonialize and civilize, the Lac led by two women-the Trung sisters revolted against the Sinitic ruling class in 39 AD. After gaining a briefly independence amid the Trung sisters' rebellion, the Lac chiefs and elites were massacred, deported and forced to adopt Han cultures by Chinese general Ma Yuan.

Later, Chinese historians writing of Ma Yuan's expedition referred to the Lac/Luo as the "Luoyue" or simply as the "Yue." Furthermore, there is no information and record about the Lac after 44 AD. Some of them fled to the southern hinterland.

Language and genetics
The language of the Lac Viet remains controversial.

The Lac Viet are generally believed to be Austroasiatic speakers. Specifically, they are thought to be Khmer-speaking by Sinologist Edward Schafer. French linguist Michel Ferlus in 2009 draws his conclusion that they were northern Vietic (Viet–Muong) speakers and believes that the Vietnamese are direct descendants of the Dongsonians (i.e. Lac Viet). Keith Taylor (2014) speculates that, the Lac Viet were either Proto-Viet-Muong speakers or Khmuic speakers, another Austroasiatic group who inhabit northwest Vietnam and northern Laos. James Chamberlain (2016), on the other hand, proposes that the Lac Viet were ancestors to Central Tai speakers and Southwestern Tai-speakers (including Thai people); however, based on layers of Chinese loanwords in proto-Southwestern Tai and other historical evidence, Pittayawat Pittayaporn (2014) proposes that the southwestward migration of southwestern Tai-speaking tribes from the modern Guangxi to the mainland of Southeast Asia must have taken place sometimes between the 8th–10th centuries CE at the earliest, long after 44BCE, when the Luoyue had been last mentioned.

Archaeological evidence reveals that during the pre-Dongson period, the Red River Delta was prominently Austroasiatic: for instance, genetic samples from the Mán Bạc burial site (dated 1,800 BC) have close proximity to modern Austroasiatic speakers, and then during the Dongson period, genetic examples yield to a significant proportion of Tai stocks (known as Au, Li-Lao) possibly living along with Vietic speakers.

Culture and society

Lạc lords were hereditary aristocrats in something like a feudal system. The status of Lạc lords passed through the family line of one's mother and tribute was obtained from communities of agriculturalists who practiced group responsibility. In Lạc society, access to land was based on communal usage rather than individual ownership and women possessed inheritance rights. While in Chinese society men inherited wealth through their fathers, in Lạc society both men and women inherited wealth through their mothers.

Ancient Han Chinese had described the people of Âu Lạc as barbaric in need of civilizing, regarding them as lacking morals and modesty. Chinese chronicles maintain the native people in the Hong River Delta were deficient in knowledge of agriculture, metallurgy, politics, and their civilization was a by-product of Chinese colonization. They denied in situ cultural evolution or social complexity, attributing any development to Sinicization, though they were aware of this "stable, structured, productive, populous, and relatively sophisticated" society they encountered. A record from the 220s BCE reported "unorthodox customs" of inhabitants in parts of the region:“To crop the hair, decorate the body, rub pigment into arms and fasten garments on the left side is the way of the Bakviet. In the country of Tai-wu the habit is to blacken teeth, scar cheeks and wear caps of sheat [catfish] skin stitched crudely with an awl.” Hou Hanshu described the region as thick with dense forests, and full of ponds and lakes, with countless wild animals like elephants, rhinoceros and tigers, while the locals earned their living by hunting and fishing, using bows propelling poisoned arrows, tattooing themselves, and wearing chignon and turbans. They also are said to know how to cast copper implements and pointed arrowheads, chewing betel nuts and blackening their teeth. However, such descriptions of the kingdom bear little resemblance to what we know: not a place of fertile cultivation or habitation on a large scale. Some of the descriptions may apply rather well to the region of present-day Guangxi and Guangdong, which remain inhospitable for many years to come, evident in census of the year 2 AD. 

Women enjoyed high status in Lạc society. Such a society is a matrilocal society, a societal system in which a married couple resides with or near the wife's parents. Thus, the female offspring of a mother remain living in (or near) the mother's house, forming large clan-families couples after marriage would often go to live with the wife's family. It has also been said that Proto-Vietnamese society was matrilineal. The status of Lạc lords transferred through the mother's lineage while women possessed inheritance rights. In addition, they also practiced levirate, meaning widows had a right to marry a male relative of her late husband, often his brother, to obtain heirs. This practice provided an heir for the mother, protecting widows' interests and reflecting female authority, although some patriarchal societies used it to keep wealth within the male family bloodline.

The economy was characterized by agriculture with wet rice cultivation, draft animals, metal plowshares, axes and other tools, as well as irrigation complexes. The cultivation of irrigated rice may have started in the beginning of the second millennium BCE, evidenced by findings from palynological sequences, while metal tools were regularly used before any significant Sino-Vietic interaction. Chapuis (1995) also suggested the existence of line fishing and some specialization and division of labor. The region was also a major node or hub of interregional access and exchange, connected to other area through an extensive extraregional trade network, since well before the first millennium BC, thanks to its strategic location, enjoying access to key interaction routes and resources, including proximity to major rivers or the coast and a high distribution of copper, tin, and lead ores. Kim (2015) believed its economic and commercial value, including its location and access to key waterways and exotic tropical goods, would have been main reasons the Chinese conquered the region, giving them unrestricted access to other parts of Southeast Asia.

Contested ancestors and nationalism
The Lạc Việt's vague identity and heritage are claimed today by from both those in China and Vietnam. Nationalist scholarships from both sides misinterpret the Lạc Việt/Luoyue as a distinct ancient ethnic group with direct unbreakable connections to modern Vietnamese people (Kinh people) in Vietnam and Zhuang people in Southern China. Several Vietnamese scholars from the 1950s have argued that the Lạc Việt/Luoyue were exclusively ancestors of the Vietnamese Kinh people . On the Chinese side, the Lạc Việt/Luoyue are remembered as an ancient Zhuang kingdom and ancestors of the Zhuang. Lạc Việt/Luoyue'' however was a merely xenonym used by ancient Han Empire scribers to refer the tribal confederation in ancient Guangxi and Northern Vietnam whom they believed to be a variety of the Yue. These Yue and Luoyue likely refer to diverse groups of peoples speaking different languages who perhaps shared certain cultural practices, rather than to a clearly defined ethnic group speaking a single language.

See also

 Đông Sơn culture
 History of Vietnam
 Hồng Bàng dynasty
 Hundred Yue 
 Âu Việt
 Âu Lạc
 Nam Việt
 Triệu dynasty
 An Dương Vương

Notes

References

Bibliography
 
 
 
 
 
 
 
 

  
  
 

 

 

 
 

  
 
 

 

3rd-century BC Asian people
Ancient peoples of China
Ancient Vietnam
History of Guangxi
Hong River Delta
Nanyue